In mathematics, the prime number theorem (PNT) describes the asymptotic distribution of the prime numbers among the positive integers. It formalizes the intuitive idea that primes become less common as they become larger by precisely quantifying the rate at which this occurs.  The theorem was proved independently by Jacques Hadamard and Charles Jean de la Vallée Poussin in 1896 using ideas introduced by Bernhard Riemann (in particular, the Riemann zeta function).

Consequently, a random integer with at most  digits (for large enough ) is about half as likely to be prime as a random integer with at most  digits. For example, among the positive integers of at most 1000 digits, about one in 2300 is prime, whereas among positive integers of at most 2000 digits, about one in 4600 is prime.

Statement

For example,  because there are four prime numbers (2, 3, 5 and 7) less than or equal to 10.

 

known as the asymptotic law of distribution of prime numbers. Using asymptotic notation this result can be restated as

This notation (and the theorem) does not say anything about the limit of the difference of the two functions as  increases without bound. Instead, the theorem states that  approximates  in the sense that the relative error of this approximation approaches 0 as  increases without bound.

The prime number theorem is equivalent to the statement that the th prime number  satisfies

the asymptotic notation meaning, again, that the relative error of this approximation approaches 0 as  increases without bound.

On the other hand, the following asymptotic relations are logically equivalent:

As outlined below, the prime number theorem is also equivalent to

where  is the Mertens function.

History of the proof of the asymptotic law of prime numbers

Carl Friedrich Gauss considered the same question at age 15 or 16 "in the year 1792 or 1793", according to his own recollection in 1849. In 1838 Peter Gustav Lejeune Dirichlet came up with his own approximating function, the logarithmic integral  (under the slightly different form of a series, which he communicated to Gauss).

In two papers from 1848 and 1850, the Russian mathematician Pafnuty Chebyshev attempted to prove the asymptotic law of distribution of prime numbers. His work is notable for the use of the zeta function , for real values of the argument "", as in works of Leonhard Euler, as early as 1737. Chebyshev's papers predated Riemann's celebrated memoir of 1859, and he succeeded in proving a slightly weaker form of the asymptotic law, namely, that if the limit as  goes to infinity of   exists at all, then it is necessarily equal to one. He was able to prove unconditionally that this ratio is bounded above and below by two explicitly given constants near 1, for all sufficiently large .

An important paper concerning the distribution of prime numbers was Riemann's 1859 memoir "On the Number of Primes Less Than a Given Magnitude", the only paper he ever wrote on the subject. Riemann introduced new ideas into the subject, chiefly that the distribution of prime numbers is intimately connected with the zeros of the analytically extended Riemann zeta function of a complex variable. In particular, it is in this paper that the idea to apply methods of complex analysis to the study of the real function  originates. Extending Riemann's ideas, two proofs of the asymptotic law of the distribution of prime numbers were found independently by Jacques Hadamard and Charles Jean de la Vallée Poussin and appeared in the same year (1896).

During the 20th century, the theorem of Hadamard and de la Vallée Poussin also became known as the Prime Number Theorem. Several different proofs of it were found, including the "elementary" proofs of Atle Selberg and Paul Erdős (1949). Hadamard's and de la Vallée Poussin's original proofs are long and elaborate; later proofs introduced various simplifications through the use of Tauberian theorems but remained difficult to digest. A short proof was discovered in 1980 by the American mathematician Donald J. Newman. Newman's proof is arguably the simplest known proof of the theorem, although it is non-elementary in the sense that it uses Cauchy's integral theorem from complex analysis.

Proof sketch
Here is a sketch of the proof referred to in one of Terence Tao's lectures. Like most proofs of the PNT, it starts out by reformulating the problem in terms of a less intuitive, but better-behaved, prime-counting function. The idea is to count the primes (or a related set such as the set of prime powers) with weights to arrive at a function with smoother asymptotic behavior. The most common such generalized counting function is the Chebyshev function , defined by

This is sometimes written as

where  is the von Mangoldt function, namely

It is now relatively easy to check that the PNT is equivalent to the claim that

Indeed, this follows from the easy estimates

and (using big  notation) for any ,

Let  be the Riemann zeta function.

A delicate analysis of this equation and related properties of the zeta function, using the Mellin transform and Perron's formula, shows that for non-integer  the equation

holds, where the sum is over all zeros (trivial and nontrivial) of the zeta function. This striking formula is one of the so-called explicit formulas of number theory, and is already suggestive of the result we wish to prove, since the term  (claimed to be the correct asymptotic order of ) appears on the right-hand side, followed by (presumably) lower-order asymptotic terms.

The next step in the proof involves a study of the zeros of the zeta function. The trivial zeros −2, −4, −6, −8, ... can be handled separately:

which vanishes for large . The nontrivial zeros, namely those on the critical strip , can potentially be of an asymptotic order comparable to the main term  if , so we need to show that all zeros have real part strictly less than 1.

Non-vanishing on  

This product formula follows from the existence of unique prime factorization of integers, and shows that  is never zero in this region, so that its logarithm is defined there and

Write  ; then

Now observe the identity

so that

for all . Suppose now that . Suppose that  and let  tend to 1 from above.

Finally, we can conclude that the PNT is heuristically true. To rigorously complete the proof there are still serious technicalities to overcome, due to the fact that the summation over zeta zeros in the explicit formula for  does not converge absolutely but only conditionally and in a "principal value" sense. There are several ways around this problem but many of them require rather delicate complex-analytic estimates. Edwards's book provides the details. Another method is to use Ikehara's Tauberian theorem, though this theorem is itself quite hard to prove. D.J. Newman observed that the full strength of Ikehara's theorem is not needed for the prime number theorem, and one can get away with a special case that is much easier to prove.

Newman's proof of the prime number theorem

D. J. Newman gives a quick proof of the prime number theorem (PNT). The proof is "non-elementary" by virtue of relying on complex analysis, but uses only elementary techniques from a first course in the subject: Cauchy's integral formula, Cauchy's integral theorem and estimates of complex integrals. Here is a brief sketch of this proof.  See  for the complete details.

One further piece of information needed in Newman's proof, and which is the key to the estimates in his simple method, is that   is bounded. This is proved using an ingenious and easy method due to Chebyshev.

For , 

Newman's method proves the PNT by showing the integral 

In general, the convergence of the improper integral does not imply that the integrand goes to zero at infinity, since it may oscillate, but since   is increasing, it is easy to show in this case.

  and   where 
then

which is equal to a function holomorphic on the line  .

The convergence of the integral , and thus the PNT, is proved by showing that . This involves change of order of limits since it can be written  and therefore classified as a Tauberian theorem.

The difference   is expressed using Cauchy's integral formula and then shown to be small for  large by estimating the integrand. Fix   and   such that   is holomorphic in the region  where ,  and let   be the boundary of this region.  Since 0 is in the interior of the region, Cauchy's integral formula gives 

Then where . Finally, letting  , the third integral goes to zero since   and hence  goes to zero on the contour. Combining the two estimates and the limit get

This holds for any   so , and the PNT follows.

Prime-counting function in terms of the logarithmic integral

Indeed, this integral is strongly suggestive of the notion that the "density" of primes around  should be . This function is related to the logarithm by the asymptotic expansion

In fact, in another paper in 1899 de la Vallée Poussin proved that

for some positive constant , where  is the big  notation. This has been improved to

 where .

More specifically, Helge von Koch showed in 1901 that if the Riemann hypothesis is true, the error term in the above relation can be improved to

(this last estimate is in fact equivalent to the Riemann hypothesis). The constant involved in the big  notation was estimated in 1976 by Lowell Schoenfeld: assuming the Riemann hypothesis,

for all . He also derived a similar bound for the Chebyshev prime-counting function :

for all  . This latter bound has been shown to express a variance to mean power law (when regarded as a random function over the integers) and  noise and to also correspond to the Tweedie compound Poisson distribution. (The Tweedie distributions represent a family of scale invariant distributions that serve as foci of convergence for a generalization of the central limit theorem.)

However, in 1914, J. E. Littlewood proved that  changes sign infinitely often.

Elementary proofs
In the first half of the twentieth century, some mathematicians (notably G. H. Hardy) believed that there exists a hierarchy of proof methods in mathematics depending on what sorts of numbers (integers, reals, complex) a proof requires, and that the prime number theorem (PNT) is a "deep" theorem by virtue of requiring complex analysis. This belief was somewhat shaken by a proof of the PNT based on Wiener's tauberian theorem, though this could be set aside if Wiener's theorem were deemed to have a "depth" equivalent to that of complex variable methods.

In March 1948, Atle Selberg established, by "elementary" means, the asymptotic formula

where

for primes . By July of that year, Selberg and Paul Erdős had each obtained elementary proofs of the PNT, both using Selberg's asymptotic formula as a starting point. These proofs effectively laid to rest the notion that the PNT was "deep" in that sense, and showed that technically "elementary" methods were more powerful than had been believed to be the case. On the history of the elementary proofs of the PNT, including the Erdős–Selberg priority dispute, see an article by Dorian Goldfeld.

There is some debate about the significance of Erdős and Selberg's result. There is no rigorous and widely accepted definition of the notion of elementary proof in number theory, so it is not clear exactly in what sense their proof is "elementary". Although it does not use complex analysis, it is in fact much more technical than the standard proof of PNT. One possible definition of an "elementary" proof is "one that can be carried out in first-order Peano arithmetic." There are number-theoretic statements (for example, the Paris–Harrington theorem) provable using second order but not first-order methods, but such theorems are rare to date. Erdős and Selberg's proof can certainly be formalized in Peano arithmetic, and in 1994, Charalambos Cornaros and Costas Dimitracopoulos proved that their proof can be formalized in a very weak fragment of PA, namely . However, this does not address the question of whether or not the standard proof of PNT can be formalized in PA.

Computer verifications
In 2005, Avigad et al. employed the Isabelle theorem prover to devise a computer-verified variant of the Erdős–Selberg proof of the PNT. This was the first machine-verified proof of the PNT. Avigad chose to formalize the Erdős–Selberg proof rather than an analytic one because while Isabelle's library at the time could implement the notions of limit, derivative, and transcendental function, it had almost no theory of integration to speak of.

In 2009, John Harrison employed HOL Light to formalize a proof employing complex analysis. By developing the necessary analytic machinery, including the Cauchy integral formula, Harrison was able to formalize "a direct, modern and elegant proof instead of the more involved 'elementary' Erdős–Selberg argument".

Prime number theorem for arithmetic progressions

where  is Euler's totient function. In other words, the primes are distributed evenly among the residue classes  modulo  with  . This is stronger than Dirichlet's theorem on arithmetic progressions (which only states that there is an infinity of primes in each class) and can be proved using similar methods used by Newman for his proof of the prime number theorem.

The Siegel–Walfisz theorem gives a good estimate for the distribution of primes in residue classes.

Bennett et al. 
Then there are positive constants  and  such that

where
 
and

Prime number race

Although we have in particular

However Littlewood showed in 1914 that there are infinitely many sign changes for the function

so the lead in the race switches back and forth infinitely many times. The phenomenon that  is ahead most of the time is called Chebyshev's bias. Granville and Martin give a thorough exposition and survey.

Non-asymptotic bounds on the prime-counting function
The prime number theorem is an asymptotic result.
 

In Pierre Dusart's thesis there are stronger versions of this type of inequality that are valid for larger . Later in 2010, Dusart proved:

The proof by de la Vallée Poussin implies the following: For every , there is an  such that for all ,

Approximations for the th prime number
As a consequence of the prime number theorem, one gets an asymptotic expression for the th prime number, denoted by :

A better approximation is

Rosser's theorem states that 
 
This can be improved by the following pair of bounds:

The last column, is the average prime gap below .
{| class="wikitable" style="text-align: right"
! 
! 
! 
! 
! 
! 
|-
| 10
| 4
| −0.3
| 0.921
| 2.2
| 2.5
|-
| 102
| 25
| 3.3
| 1.151
| 5.1
| 4
|-
| 103
| 168
| 23
| 1.161
| 10
| 5.952
|-
| 104
| 
| 143
| 1.132
| 17
| 8.137
|-
| 105
| 
| 906
| 1.104
| 38
| 10.425
|-
| 106
| 
| 
| 1.084
| 130
| 12.740
|-
| 107
| 
| 
| 1.071
| 339
| 15.047
|-
| 108
| 
| 
| 1.061
| 754
| 17.357
|-
| 109
| 
| 
| 1.054
| 
| 19.667
|-
| 1010
| 
| 
| 1.048
| 
| 21.975
|-
| 1011
| 
| 
| 1.043
| 
| 24.283
|-
| 1012
| 
| 
| 1.039
| 
| 26.590
|-
| 1013
| 
| 
| 1.034
| 
| 28.896
|-
| 1014
| 
| 
| 1.033
| 
| 31.202
|-
| 1015
| 
| 
| 1.031
| 
| 33.507
|-
| 1016
| 
| 
| 1.029
| 
| 35.812
|-
| 1017
| 
| 
| 1.027
| 
| 38.116
|-
| 1018
| 
| 
| 1.025
| 
| 40.420
|-
| 1019
| 
| 
| 1.024
| 
| 42.725
|-
| 1020
| 
| 
| 1.023
| 
| 45.028
|-
| 1021
| 
| 
| 1.022
| 
| 47.332
|-
| 1022
| 
| 
| 1.021
| 
| 49.636
|-
| 1023
| 
| 
| 1.020
| 
| 51.939
|-
| 1024
| 
| 
| 1.019
| 
| 54.243
|-
| 1025
| 
| 
| 1.018
| 
| 56.546
|-
| OEIS
| 
| 
| 
| 
| 
|}

Analogue for irreducible polynomials over a finite field
There is an analogue of the prime number theorem that describes the "distribution" of irreducible polynomials over a finite field; the form it takes is strikingly similar to the case of the classical prime number theorem.

In this setting, these polynomials play the role of the prime numbers, since all other monic polynomials are built up of products of them. One can then prove that

If we make the substitution , then the right hand side is just

which makes the analogy clearer. Since there are precisely  monic polynomials of degree  (including the reducible ones), this can be rephrased as follows: if a monic polynomial of degree  is selected randomly, then the probability of it being irreducible is about .

One can even prove an analogue of the Riemann hypothesis, namely that

The proofs of these statements are far simpler than in the classical case.

Möbius inversion then yields

where  is the Möbius function. (This formula was known to Gauss.)

See also
 Abstract analytic number theory for information about generalizations of the theorem.
 Landau prime ideal theorem for a generalization to prime ideals in algebraic number fields.
 Riemann hypothesis

Citations

References

External links
 
 Table of Primes by Anton Felkel.
 Short video visualizing the Prime Number Theorem.
 Prime formulas and Prime number theorem at MathWorld.
 How Many Primes Are There?  and The Gaps between Primes by Chris Caldwell, University of Tennessee at Martin.
 Tables of prime-counting functions by Tomás Oliveira e Silva
 Eberl, Manuel and Paulson, L. C. The Prime Number Theorem (Formal proof development in Isabelle/HOL, Archive of Formal Proofs)
The Prime Number Theorem: the "elementary" proof −  An exposition of the elementary proof of the Prime Number Theorem of Atle Selberg and Paul Erdős at www.dimostriamogoldbach.it/en/ 

Logarithms
Theorems about prime numbers
Theorems in analytic number theory